Saymanolinh Paseuth (born 19 July 1999), is a Laotian footballer currently playing as a goalkeeper.

Career statistics

International

References

1999 births
Living people
Laotian footballers
Laos international footballers
Association football goalkeepers